The 1999 European Parliament election in Luxembourg was the election of MEP representing Luxembourg constituency for the 1999–2004 term of the European Parliament. It was part of the wider 1999 European election. It was held on 13 June 1999.

Candidates

Results

Elected members
Christian Social People's Party
Members of the European People's Party
Astrid Lulling
Jacques Santer

Democratic Party
Members of the European Liberal Democrat and Reform Party
Colette Flesch

Luxembourg Socialist Workers' Party
Members of the Party of European Socialists
Robert Goebbels
Jacques Poos

The Greens
Members of the European Federation of Green Parties
Claude Turmes

1999, European Parliament election
Luxembourg
1999 in Luxembourg